The following are the national records in Olympic weightlifting in Great Britain. Records are maintained in each weight class for the snatch lift, clean and jerk lift, and the total for both lifts by British Weight Lifting (BWL).

Current records
Key to tables:

Men

Women

Historical records (1998–2018)

Men

Women

Notes

References
General
British records – Men 21 December 2022
British records – Women 21 December 2022 updated
Specific

External links
British Weightlifting web site
British Weightlifting records page

Great Britain
Records
Olympic weightlifting
Weightlifting